Marcus Walter Walden (born September 13, 1988) is an American professional baseball pitcher who is a free agent. He has played in Major League Baseball (MLB) for the Boston Red Sox. He made his MLB debut during 2018 after a decade of minor and independent league baseball.

Career
Walden attended Central High School in Fresno, California, and Fresno City College.

Toronto Blue Jays
The Toronto Blue Jays selected Walden in the ninth round of the 2007 MLB draft.

After pitching with Toronto's Rookie League and Class A Short-Season teams during 2007 and 2008, Walden missed most of the 2009 season and the entire 2010 season due to shoulder and elbow injuries that required surgeries, including Tommy John surgery. He returned to pitch for several Toronto farm teams during the 2011 through 2014 seasons, ultimately being promoted to the Triple-A Buffalo Bisons. The Blue Jays promoted Walden to the major leagues in April 2014, but they optioned him back to the minor leagues five days later without using him in a major league game. Six days later, Walden was designated for assignment by the Blue Jays.

Oakland Athletics
Walden was claimed off of waivers by the Oakland Athletics in April 2014, and he spent the remainder of the season with Oakland's Double-A and Triple-A teams. In 2015, Walden signed with the Cincinnati Reds organization and began the season with the Pensacola Blue Wahoos of the Double-A Southern League. He was released, and signed with the Lancaster Barnstormers of the Atlantic League of Professional Baseball, an independent baseball league.

Minnesota Twins
Walden signed with the Minnesota Twins organization for the 2016 season. He split time between their Double-A and Triple-A affiliates, appearing in a combined 42 games with a 2.40 ERA and 1.065 WHIP with six saves and 40 strikeouts in  innings pitched.

Boston Red Sox
In December 2016, Walden signed with the Boston Red Sox. He pitched for the Triple-A Pawtucket Red Sox during the 2017 season, pitching  innings in 29 games (15 starts) with a 10–6 record, 3.92 ERA, and 1.306 WHIP while recording 86 strikeouts and 36 walks.

After pitching effectively during spring training, Walden was named to the Opening Day 25-man roster for the 2018 Boston Red Sox, expected to be the long reliever for rookie manager Alex Cora. Walden made his major league debut on April 1, pitching  innings of relief against the Tampa Bay Rays, giving up no runs and one hit while facing five batters. On April 14, he earned his first save, pitching three innings of relief in a 10–3 win over the Baltimore Orioles. He was sent down to the Triple-A Pawtucket Red Sox before the end of the month, was recalled very briefly in early May, and then spent the remainder of the season in the minors.  With Boston, he appeared in a total of eight games with a 0–0 record and one save, while recording a 3.68 ERA and 14 strikeouts in  innings.

In 2019, Walden was optioned to Triple-A Pawtucket prior to Opening Day. He was called up on April 6, when Brian Johnson was placed on the injured list, and recorded his first MLB win the next day, pitching two innings of scoreless relief in a 1–0 win over the Arizona Diamondbacks. He was optioned back to Pawtucket effective on April 16, then recalled to Boston on April 19. Overall with the 2019 Red Sox, Walden appeared in 70 games, compiling a 9–2 record with 3.81 ERA and 76 strikeouts in 78 innings.

In 2020, Walden was on Boston's active roster at the delayed start of the season. He was optioned to the team's alternate training site on August 19, and recalled on September 3. Overall with the 2020 Red Sox, Walden appeared in 15 games, all in relief, compiling an 0–2 record with 9.45 ERA and 10 strikeouts in  innings pitched.

On February 24, 2021, Walden was designated for assignment by the Red Sox after the signing of Marwin González was made official. On March 1, Walden was outrighted to Triple-A and invited to spring training as a non-roster invitee. In 27 appearances for the Triple-A Worcester Red Sox, Walden recorded a 5-3 record with a 4.01 ERA and 40 strikeouts. On August 7, 2021, Walden was released by the Red Sox.

Chicago Cubs
On August 19, 2021, Walden signed a minor league deal with the Chicago Cubs.

Gastonia Honey Hunters
On April 20, 2022, Walden signed with the Gastonia Honey Hunters of the Atlantic League of Professional Baseball.

Milwaukee Brewers
On June 23, 2022, Walden signed a minor league deal with the Milwaukee Brewers. On December 16, Walden was released.

Personal life
Walden and his wife, Nichole, have two daughters, Sutton and Palmer. Walden and two business partners opened the DIB Baseball Academy in Fresno in 2015.

References

Further reading

External links

Biography at DIB Baseball Academy

1988 births
Living people
Auburn Doubledays players
Baseball players from California
Boston Red Sox players
Buffalo Bisons (minor league) players
Chattanooga Lookouts players
Dunedin Blue Jays players
Fresno City Rams baseball players
Gastonia Honey Hunters players
Gulf Coast Blue Jays players
Lancaster Barnstormers players
Lansing Lugnuts players
Major League Baseball pitchers
Midland RockHounds players
New Hampshire Fisher Cats players
Pawtucket Red Sox players
Pensacola Blue Wahoos players
Rochester Red Wings players
Sacramento River Cats players
Sportspeople from Fresno, California
Tigres de Aragua players
American expatriate baseball players in Venezuela
Toros del Este players
American expatriate baseball players in the Dominican Republic
Worcester Red Sox players
Iowa Cubs players
Nashville Sounds players